Bodybuilding at the Pan American Games was only held at the 2019 Pan American Games in Lima, Peru.

Medal table

Medalists

Men's events

Class bodybuilding

Women's events

Bikini fitness

References

Bodybuilding
Bodybuilding at the Pan American Games
Bodybuilding at multi-sport events